{{DISPLAYTITLE:C36H22O18}}
The molecular formula C36H22O18 (molar mass: 742.52 g/mol, exact mass: 742.0806128 u) may refer to:

 Dieckol, an eckol-type phlorotannin
 6,6'-Bieckol, an eckol-type phlorotannin
 8,8′-Bieckol, an eckol-type phlorotannin